In histology, cryptitis refers to inflammation of an intestinal crypt. 

Cryptitis is a non-specific histopathologic finding that is seen in several conditions, e.g. inflammatory bowel disease, diverticular disease, radiation colitis, infectious colitis.

Additional images

References

Inflammations
Gastrointestinal tract disorders